Charles Silvester Horne (1865–1914) was a Congregational minister, who additionally served as Liberal MP for Ipswich, and was a noted orator. He was the father of Kenneth Horne.

Childhood 
He was born in Cuckfield, Sussex, on 15 April 1865, the youngest child of Charles Horne, the minister of Cuckfield Congregational Church, and his wife, whose maiden name was Harriet Silvester Simpson. 

When he was six weeks old the family moved to Newport, Shropshire. Here Charles Horne gave up the ministry, becoming the editor of the local newspaper, the Newport Advertiser and became a partner of his wife's uncle, Charles Silvester in a printing and bookselling firm. Horne lived the rest of his childhood in the town, and was educated at Adams' Grammar School, where his headmaster was Tom Collins. His father's newspaper was a family business, and every member of the family helped with it at some point. 

The family at this time attended the Newport Congregational Chapel, which is described by Horne's biographer as "The most considerable Nonconformist place of worship in the town." It was through this church that Horne first began to preach, and his thoughts turned towards the Congregational ministry.

Early adult years 
He graduated MA from the University of Glasgow in 1886 and subsequently studied theology at Mansfield College, Oxford, where he was in the first intake of students at the new Congregational college, before beginning his working life as Minister of Kensington Congregational Chapel. During this period he married Katharine, the eldest daughter of Lord Cozens Hardy, Master of the Rolls from 1907 until 1918.

Fame grows 
His fame as a preacher and author grew after he took over Whitefield's Tabernacle, Tottenham Court Road in 1903, which he rebuilt as Whitefield's Central Mission. He wrote hymns which are still sung today. From 1910 until his death he had a national platform for his views as an MP.

Death 
In 1914, while on holiday in Canada, returning from Niagara Falls, he was suddenly taken ill travelling on a steamer and died, aged forty-nine, before arriving at Toronto. His body was taken home and buried at Church Stretton, Shropshire, in the cemetery at Cunnery Road. Tributes poured in and his memorial service was attended by David Lloyd George. His wife and all his children except for his son, Herbert, were to outlive him by over half a century; his last surviving children lived until 1984. One of his grandchildren, Ronald Gordon, was Bishop of Portsmouth from 1975 to 1984.

Family 
He married Katharine Cozens-Hardy, daughter of Herbert Cozens-Hardy in Kensington, London in 1892 with whom he had seven children:

Born in Kensington, London:
 Dorothy (1893 – 1959), married Sir Archibald Gordon; mother of Archibald Ronald McDonald Gordon
 Herbert Oliver (1894 – 1946)
 Margaret Bridget (1897 – 1984)
 Joan Silvester (1899/1900 – 1984)
 Ronald Cozens-Hardy (1902 –
1983)

Born in St. Pancras, London:
 Ruth Audrey (1905 – 1981)
 Charles Kenneth (1907 – 1969)

Silvester Horne Institute 
In Church Stretton is the Silvester Horne Institute, a notable community building that serves as the town council's meeting place. During his life he also built the White House on the town's Sandford Avenue, as the family home, which later becoming a nursing home before being demolished in 2006.

Bibliography 

 The life of Charles Silvester Horne, M.A., M.P. ([1920]) Author: Selbie, W.B. University of California Libraries Details of Biography
 The romance of preaching / Author: Horne, Charles Silvester, Publisher: New York : Fleming H. Revell Company, London James Clarke & Co Volumes of Sermons held in Iowa Libraries
 A Modern Heretic, novel- Horne, C.S. British Library Cataloguing
 Life of David Livingstone-Horne, C.S.  List of Livingstone Biographies

References

External links
 

The life of Charles Silvester Horne, M.A., M.P – whole book (published 1920) available online

1865 births
1914 deaths
Alumni of the University of Glasgow
English Congregationalists
British Congregationalist ministers
UK MPs 1910
UK MPs 1910–1918
People from Cuckfield
Members of the Parliament of the United Kingdom for Ipswich
Liberal Party (UK) MPs for English constituencies
People educated at Adams' Grammar School
Church Stretton